Expedition 20 was the 20th long-duration flight to the International Space Station. The expedition marked the first time a six-member crew inhabited the station. Because each Soyuz-TMA spacecraft could hold only three people, two separate launches were necessary: Soyuz TMA-14 launched on 26 March 2009, and Soyuz TMA-15 followed on 27 May 2009.

Soyuz TMA-15 launched from Baikonur Cosmodrome at 10:34 UTC on 27 May 2009. The vehicle docked with the station on 29 May 2009, officially changing the Soyuz TMA-14 crew from Expedition 19 to Expedition 20.

Gennady Padalka was the first commander of a six-member station crew, and the first commander of two consecutive expeditions (Expedition 19 and 20). Nicole Stott was the final expedition astronaut to be launched on the shuttle.

During the expedition, Koichi Wakata performed a special experiment wherein he did not change his underpants for one month, in order to test a specially-designed underwear without washing or changing; he reportedly did not develop body odor due to the effects of the special garment.

The station would not be permanently occupied by six crew members all year. For example, when the Expedition 20 crew (Roman Romanenko, Frank De Winne and Bob Thirsk) returned to Earth in November 2009, for a period of about two weeks only two crew members (Jeff Williams and Max Surayev) were aboard. This increased to five in early December, when Oleg Kotov, Timothy Creamer and Soichi Noguchi arrived on Soyuz TMA-17. It decreased to three when Williams and Surayev departed in March 2010, and finally returned to six in April 2010 with the arrival of Soyuz TMA-18, carrying Aleksandr Skvortsov, Mikhail Korniyenko and Tracy Caldwell Dyson.

Crew

Backup crew
  Maksim Surayev, Commander
  Jeff Williams
  Timothy Creamer
  Catherine Coleman
  André Kuipers
  Dimitri Kondratyev
  Chris Hadfield

Extra-vehicular activity

‡ denotes spacewalks performed from the Pirs docking compartment in Russian Orlan suits.

On 3 July 2009 expedition members undocked the Soyuz TMA-14 craft from the aft port of the Zvezda service module and piloted it over to the Pirs docking compartment. This was done to clear the way for the arrival of a Progress supply craft.

See also 
 Extravehicular activity
 List of cumulative spacewalk records
 List of International Space Station spacewalks
 List of spacewalks 2000–2014

References

External links

NASA's Space Station Expeditions page
Expedition 20 Photography

Expeditions to the International Space Station
2009 in spaceflight